Maria Jocelyn Valera Bernos is a Filipina politician from the province of Abra in the Philippines. She currently serves as the Vice Governor of Abra. She was first elected as Governor of the province in 2016 and was re-elected in 2019.

References

External links
Province of Abra Official Website

Living people
1977 births
Governors of Abra (province)
Women provincial governors of the Philippines
National Unity Party (Philippines) politicians